Pelonomi Venson-Moitoi is a Botswana journalist and politician who served as Minister of Foreign Affairs of Botswana from 2014 until December 2018. She was appointed to the National Assembly of Botswana in 1999 as one of the four specially selected members and was re-elected in the 2004 general elections.

Venson-Moitoi was the Minister of Works, Transport and Communications from 2001 to 2002 and Minister of Trade, Industry, Wildlife and Tourism from 2002 to 2004. She was appointed as the Minister of Communications, Science, and Technology in 2004. In the 2009 cabinet, Venson-Moitoi was appointed Minister of Communications, Science and Technology, and later she was appointed as Minister of Education.

On 17 December 2018, Venson-Moitoi announced that she would contest the party presidency. President Mokgweetsi Masisi sacked her from Cabinet the following day.

On 5 April 2019 she wrote a letter to Secretary General of the Botswana Democratic Party stating that she was withdrawing from the presidential election, alleging that the election was "rigged from the beginning." The previous day, the High Court had ruled against her request to have the elective congress postponed, agreed with opposition lawyers that she had not proved if her citizenship was by birth or descent. Her candidacy had been supported by former President Ian Khama, who slammed the ruling party, accusing them of "cheating, intolerance and intimidation."

See also
List of foreign ministers in 2017

References

External links
Profile on Ministry of Communications, Science, and Technology homepage

1951 births
Living people
Botswana Democratic Party politicians
Botswana journalists
Botswana women journalists
Members of the National Assembly (Botswana)
Women government ministers of Botswana
Communication ministers of Botswana
Education ministers of Botswana
Foreign Ministers of Botswana
Industry ministers of Botswana
Tourism ministers of Botswana
Trade ministers of Botswana
Transport ministers of Botswana
21st-century Botswana women politicians
21st-century Botswana politicians
Female foreign ministers